MI-3 may refer to:

 Mission: Impossible III
 
 M-3 (Michigan highway)
 MI3, branch of British military intelligence
 Mil Mi-3 aircraft
 Xiaomi Mi3, a smartphone
 mi3 or cubic mile
 The Curse of Monkey Island (also known as Monkey Island 3), videogame